Michael Wells Corby (born 18 February 1940) is a British field hockey and squash player. He competed at the 1964 Summer Olympics and the 1972 Summer Olympics in Hockey. He also represented England at the 1967, 1969 and the 1971 World Team Squash Championships.
Attended Mill Hill School in North London.

References

External links
 

1940 births
Living people
British male field hockey players
English male squash players
Olympic field hockey players of Great Britain
Field hockey players at the 1964 Summer Olympics
Field hockey players at the 1972 Summer Olympics
Place of birth missing (living people)